Stine Andersen  (born 16 January 1985) is a Danish sports shooter. She competed in the Women's 10 metre air rifle event at the 2012 Summer Olympics.

References

External links
 

1985 births
Living people
People from Odsherred Municipality
Danish female sport shooters
Olympic shooters of Denmark
Shooters at the 2012 Summer Olympics
Sportspeople from Region Zealand
21st-century Danish women